EMPIRE is the third studio album by American recording artist Frankie DeCarlos.

Track listing

References

2011 albums